Alia Armstrong  (born 28 December 2000) is an American athlete.

Whilst running for Louisiana State University, Armstrong initially had a frustrating time in 2022 when she was disqualified from the SEC indoor championships and disqualified again at the NCAA indoor finals. In June 2022, however, Armstrong won the outdoor NCAA championship in Eugene, Oregon over 100 metres hurdles running a new personal best 12.55 in the semi finals, and then 12.57 in the final. Armstrong then finished third in the senior 2022 USATF championship, after running a personal best 12.47 seconds in the final, also held in Eugene, Oregon. With this performance Armstrong was able to make the USA squad for the 2022 World Athletics Championships, again held in Eugene, Oregon. In the heats of the World Championships Armstrong ran 12.48 to make the semi-finals on her major championship debut.

References

2000 births
Living people
LSU Lady Tigers track and field athletes
United States collegiate record holders in athletics (track and field)
USA Outdoor Track and Field Championships winners
American female hurdlers
African-American female track and field athletes
World Athletics Championships athletes for the United States
Sportspeople from New Orleans
Track and field athletes from New Orleans
21st-century African-American sportspeople
21st-century African-American women